Richard Dickel is a New Zealand basketball coach.

Career 
Dickel, who is based in Invercargill, has previously played for the Waikato Pistons and Otago Nuggets in the NZNBL. He has been in charge of the Southland Provincial Squad for over five years and is employed by the Southland Basketball Association as a Development Officer. It was announced on 23 December 2009 that Dickel would coach the new Southland Sharks franchise in the NZNBL competition. He is the brother of former player Mark Dickel. For the 2010 CBL season, Dickel was a player/coach for the Southland Flyers. Their father, Carl Dickel, played first-class cricket for Otago and coached the New Zealand women's national basketball team for ten years and the Otago Nuggets for four seasons.

Dickel joined the Adelaide 36ers as an assistant coach for the 2013–14 season. Midway through the season, Dickel moved from the 36ers to become head coach of the Adelaide Lightning who play in the Australian Women's National Basketball League.

Dickel in 2015 agreed to coach in the Norway BLNO for the Nidaros Jets representing the City of Trondheim and stayed on the job for one season (2015–16). In 2021/22 Coach Dickel was again consulting with the Nidaros Jets Coaching staff and players in charge of helping with scouting.

In May 2017, he was named head coach of the Launceston Tornadoes of the SEABL. Dickel coached the team to a 12–10 record and left after the 2017 season. He then took the job as Basketball Development Manager at the South Adelaide Basketball Club.

In May 2018, Coach Dickel was named Basketball Development Manager at the South Adelaide Panthers. During this time at the club the participation numbers have almost doubled in some cases and player/team development has improved to the point in 2022 two teams making the Australian Classic National finals a first for the club's 70-year history.

In 2019 he took over the role of NBL1 Women's coach for the South Adelaide Panthers Club. The team have developed into a top 4 team in 2020 2021 and 2022 confirming a major developmental upgrade for this team in a sort period of time.

References

External links
New Sharks coach wants happy team in South
Dickel confident of putting good team together

New Zealand men's basketball players
Living people
Year of birth missing (living people)
Waikato Pistons players
Otago Nuggets players
New Zealand expatriate basketball people in Australia
New Zealand expatriate basketball people in Norway
New Zealand basketball coaches